Éric Mouloungui (born 1 April 1984) is a Gabonese former professional footballer who played as a winger. He spent most of his career in France while representing the Gabon national team at international level.

Club career
Mouloungui was born in Port-Gentil, Gabon. He began his career in his native Gabon at Mangasport Moanda, before moving to CFA 2 side Vauban Strasbourg, France in 2002. Here he spent a year before signing for RC Strasbourg, then of the French top flight.

For the first half of the 2005–06 season Mouloungui gained first-team experience on loan to FC Gueugnon in Ligue 2 before returning to his Alsace based parent club in January 2006. Here he made two first team appearances, not scoring, as Strasbourg were relegated to Ligue 2.

In the 2006–07 season he was top goal scorer for his side with 11 goals from 30 games, helping the club make a swift return to the French top flight, after just one season spent in the second tier. He became first choice forward for his club, starting Strasbourg's first Ligue 1 game in the 2007–08 season alongside on-loan FC Porto striker Wason Rentería against French giants Marseille with the game ending in a 0–0 draw.

In 2008, he joined Côte d'Azur based side OGC Nice, taking the number 11 shirt.

On 17 July 2014, Mouloungui transferred to China League One side Shenyang Zhongze.

International career
In the 2012 Africa Cup of Nations he scored a goal in the quarterfinals, but it did not help the team further, as they lost on penalties. But it is still the best result in history Gabon.

References

External links

1984 births
Living people
People from Ogooué-Maritime Province
Association football forwards
Gabonese footballers
Gabon international footballers
2010 Africa Cup of Nations players
2012 Africa Cup of Nations players
China League One players
Ligue 1 players
Ligue 2 players
Championnat National players
Championnat National 3 players
Ekstraklasa players
ASPV Strasbourg players
RC Strasbourg Alsace players
FC Gueugnon players
OGC Nice players
Al Wahda FC players
Śląsk Wrocław players
Gabonese expatriate footballers
Gabonese expatriate sportspeople in France
Expatriate footballers in France
Expatriate footballers in Poland
Gabonese expatriate sportspeople in the United Arab Emirates
Expatriate footballers in the United Arab Emirates
Gabonese expatriate sportspeople in China
Expatriate footballers in China
UAE Pro League players
21st-century Gabonese people